Deville Glacier is a glacier flowing along the south side of the Laussedat Heights into Andvord Bay, on the west coast of Graham Land. The glacier is shown on an Argentine government chart of 1952. It was named by the UK Antarctic Place-Names Committee in 1960 for Edouard G. Deville, Surveyor-General of Canada, 1885–1924, who introduced and developed photogrammetric methods of survey in Canada from 1888 onward.

References 

Glaciers of Danco Coast